Peter Fagan is an American Republican politician who represented Rutland-5-1 district in the Vermont House of Representatives from 2009 until 2023. He retired from the house before the 2022 Vermont House of Representatives election.

References 

Living people
21st-century American politicians
Republican Party members of the Vermont House of Representatives
Year of birth missing (living people)